Ken Davenport (born Kenneth Anjum Hasija, August 23, 1972) is a two-time Tony Award-winning theatre producer, blogger, and writer. He is best known for his production work on Broadway.

Early life and career
Davenport was born in Phoenix, Arizona to Dr. Kenny Hasija and Pamela Soper (née Davenport). He grew up in Sturbridge, Massachusetts and attended the Bancroft School in Worcester, Massachusetts. He attended Johns Hopkins University for one year with the intention of practicing law, before transferring to New York University's Tisch School of the Arts. He graduated in 1994 with a Bachelor of Fine Arts in Acting.

Davenport began his professional theater career by working as a production assistant on the 1993 Broadway revival of My Fair Lady starring Richard Chamberlain. Before he began his producing career, he established himself as a company and general manager, working on shows such as Grease, Show Boat, Ragtime, Thoroughly Modern Millie, and Gypsy.

Davenport Theatrical Enterprises
Davenport founded Davenport Theatrical Enterprises (DTE) in 2004, and has created, produced, and managed shows under that business for the last 15 years. His first ventures as a producer were the three Off-Broadway shows The Awesome 80s Prom, Altar Boyz, and My First Time, which he also wrote. Davenport's first Broadway credit as a producer was 13, and since then he has produced over a dozen other Broadway shows, including the first Broadway revival of Godspell, the Tony Award-winning Best Musical Kinky Boots, and Deaf West Theatre's Spring Awakening.

Since its founding, Davenport Theatrical Enterprises has expanded to other areas of the theater business. It founded Broadway Genius Group Sales, a group sales agency for Broadway and Off-Broadway shows; DTE Agency, a theatrical marketing agency; and DTE Management, a general management division. In 2019, DTE Management relaunched as Architect Theatrical.

Davenport Theatrical Enterprises has founded several websites, including Your Broadway Genius, Best of Off-Broadway, and both the website and smartphone app Did He Like It?, a review aggregator for New York theater based on New York Times chief theatre critic Ben Brantley.  Additionally, Davenport is the creator of Be a Broadway Star, the only Broadway-themed board game.

In 2019, Inc. 5000 named Davenport Theatrical Enterprises one of America’s fastest-growing private companies.

He is the founder of TheaterMakersStudio.com, a one-of-a-kind "masterclass" community with the goal of educating and inspiring writers, directors, producers and more to get their shows off the ground.

Davenport's television and film credits include the documentary These Magnificent Miles: On the Road with Red Wanting Blue, and The Bunny Hole, an award-winning television pilot that has appeared in the LA Indie Film Festival, the Orlando Film Festival, the LA Comedy Festival and more.

He managed and owned the Davenport Theatre, an Off-Broadway theater in Manhattan's Theater District until January 2019.  The Davenport Theatre had two performance spaces, a 149-seat main stage on the ground level, and a 60-seat blackbox theater on the upper level.  Davenport named the theater after his great-grandfather, Delbert Essex Davenport, who was a theater producer, publicist, author and lyricist in the early 1900s.

Innovations in Marketing and Producing

Davenport is well known among the Broadway community as an innovative producer and marketer.  He started The Producer's Perspective in 2008, a blog on which he shares his thoughts, experiences and opinions that is dedicated to making Broadway accessible and understandable.

Davenport's unique marketing initiatives have helped to bring attention to his Broadway and Off-Broadway productions.  In 2007, his Off-Broadway show My First Time had a "Virgins get in free" promotion, during which audience members who were determined to be "virgins" by a psychic received a free ticket to the show.  In 2012, Davenport instated the first ever "Tweet Seats" for a Broadway show during his production of Godspell.  During a specially designated performance, 15 of the show's biggest fans received free tickets specifically so they could share their experience during the show on Twitter and promote it on social media.

In 2006 on his Off-Broadway production of Altar Boyz, Davenport became the first producer to send audience members a follow-up email after they attended a show, a method now widely used across the industry.

In 2010, Davenport announced that he would be crowd-funding his Broadway revival of Godspell. Godspell was the first Broadway production to use the crowd-funding model.  Previously, Broadway investing was open to only accredited investors, who would ordinarily invest tens of thousands of dollars.  In comparison, Godspell was largely funded by 700 investors (called "People of Godspell") who were able to invest amounts as small as $1,000.  Davenport was lauded for making Broadway investing accessible to "average people," and for helping to bring a new crowd of investors into the Broadway community.

In 2012, Davenport held auditions to find the "Godspell Cast of 2032," a group of children ages 6 to 16 who were given the chance to perform with the Broadway cast.  Over 500 children auditioned, and 10 were chosen to join the company of Godspell for the curtain call for one night only.

In Macbeth on Broadway, Alan Cummings played all the roles. Organically, the show's mission took a step further. Davenport asked Cummings to step into another role to get up close and personal with the audience. He went to the theater on a rainy, Sunday morning to sell rush tickets at the Box Office, this allowed the audience to interact with him on and off the stage.

Gettin' the Band Back Together is set in Sayreville, NJ. In hopes of creating something special, Davenport asked the mayor and entire town to co-produce this musical with him. He was very specific as to who sent out press releases. He wanted to make the town feel as if it was similar to a sports team, Sayreville musical: Gettin' the Band Back Together!

During the Portland Center Stage run of his musical Somewhere in Time, Davenport used dial-testing to partially gauge audience reaction.  Although dial-testing is common in film and television, Davenport was the first producer to use it for the stage.  While dial-testing is a controversial issue in the Broadway community, with some believing it will create formulaic theater, others see it as a useful tool, as detailed in the New York Times story covering the testing of Somewhere in Time.

On November 30, 2015, Davenport announced that he would be livestreaming a performance of his Off-Broadway musical, Daddy Long Legs.  The performance was broadcast online for free on December 10, 2015.  Although the Metropolitan Opera and National Theatre Live, an initiative of the Royal National Theatre, have broadcast theatrical productions in the past, this was the first time a Broadway or Off-Broadway production was livestreamed.

On January 15, 2016, the producers of Spring Awakening, in association with The Broadway League, presented a symposium titled "How to Make Broadway More Accessible," featuring members of the disability community and a keynote address from Timothy Shriver, chairman of Special Olympics.

Other activities
Davenport was named one of Crain's "40 Under 40", and received the 2010 Leonidas A. Nickole Award of Distinction from the Musical Theatre Society of Emerson College. He won the 2008 Spirit of Theatre Award from Theatre Resources Unlimited, and his television pilot The Bunny Hole has been honored at the Orlando Film Festival, the IndieFEST Film Awards, and more.

In 2008, he appeared in one of the first Apple iPhone television commercials.

Davenport has been a guest lecturer at universities in the New York City metropolitan area. He has taught “Acting As A Business” for America Online, and his marketing techniques have been profiled in the New York Times and in marketing guru's Andy Sernovitz's book Word of Mouth Marketing.  Davenport was a member of the BMI Librettist Workshop and is a founding member of the Independent Theater Bloggers Association.

Davenport is a member of The Broadway League and the League of Off-Broadway Theaters and Producers.

Productions 
 2022, Joy: the Musical (George Street Playhouse)
 2022, Harmony: A New Musical (National Yiddish Theatre Folksbiene)
2020, Americano! (Phoenix Theatre Company) 
 2019, Frankie and Johnny in the Clair de Lune (Broadway) 
2018, Gettin' The Band Back Together (Broadway) 
2017, Once on This Island (Broadway) 
2017, Groundhog Day (Broadway) 
2017, The Play That Goes Wrong (Broadway) 
2015, Allegiance (Broadway) 
 2015, Daddy Long Legs (Off-Broadway) 
 2015, Spring Awakening (Broadway)
 2015, That Bachelorette Show (Off-Broadway)
 2015, The Visit (Broadway)
 2014, It's Only a Play (Broadway)
 2014, Mothers and Sons (Broadway)
 2014, The Bridges of Madison County (Broadway, tour)
 2013, Gettin' the Band Back Together (George Street Playhouse)
 2013, Macbeth (Broadway)
 2013, Kinky Boots (Broadway, tour, Toronto, West End)
 2011, Godspell (Broadway)
 2011, Chinglish (Broadway)
 2010, Miss Abigail's Guide to Dating, Mating, & Marriage (Off-Broadway)
 2009, Oleanna (Broadway)
 2009, Blithe Spirit (Broadway, tour, West End)
 2009, Will Ferrell's You're Welcome America (Broadway)
 2008, Speed-the-Plow (Broadway)
 2008, 13 (Broadway)
 2007, My First Time (Off-Broadway)
 2005, Altar Boyz (Off-Broadway)
 2004, The Awesome 80s Prom (Off-Broadway)

Awards and nominations
 2018: Tony Award, Best Revival of a Musical, Once on This Island (winner)
2018: Drama Desk Award, Outstanding Revival of a Musical, Once on This Island (nominee)
2017: Tony Award, Best Musical, Groundhog Day (nominee)
2016: Tony Award, Best Revival of a Musical, Spring Awakening (nominee)
2016: Drama Desk Award, Outstanding Revival of a Musical, Spring Awakening (nominee)
2016: Drama Desk Award, Outstanding Musical, Daddy Long Legs (nominee)
2015: Tony Award, Best Musical, The Visit (nominee)
 2015: Drama Desk Award, Outstanding Musical, The Visit (nominee)
 2014: Tony Award, Best Play, Mothers and Sons (nominee)
 2014: Drama Desk Award, Outstanding Musical, The Bridges of Madison County (nominee)
 2013: Tony Award, Best Musical, Kinky Boots (winner)
 2013: Broadway.com Audience Choice Award, Favorite Play Revival, Macbeth (winner)
 2012: Drama Desk Award, Outstanding Play, Chinglish (nominee)
 2012: Broadway.com Audience Choice Award, Favorite Musical Revival, Godspell (winner)
 2009: Tony Award nominee, Best Special Theatrical Event, Will Ferrell's You're Welcome America (nominee)
 2009: Broadway.com Audience Choice Award, Favorite Long-Running Off-Broadway Show, Altar Boyz (winner)
 2009: Drama Desk Award, Outstanding Revival of a Play, Blithe Spirit (nominee)
 2005: Drama Desk Award, Outstanding New Musical, Altar Boyz (nominee)
 2005: Outer Critics Circle Award, Outstanding Off Broadway Musical, Altar Boyz (winner)
 2005: Lucille Lortel Award, Outstanding Musical, Altar Boyz (nominee)

References

External links
 
 
 
 
 
 
 
 

Johns Hopkins University alumni
Tisch School of the Arts alumni
American theatre managers and producers
American theatre directors
1972 births
Living people
Place of birth missing (living people)